UFC Live: Kongo vs. Barry (also known as UFC on Versus 4) was a mixed martial arts event held by the Ultimate Fighting Championship on June 26, 2011, at Consol Energy Center in Pittsburgh, Pennsylvania.
The event was broadcast on Versus in the U.S. and was broadcast on Rogers Sportsnet in Canada.

Background
This is the fourth live UFC card to appear on Versus.

Matthew Riddle was expected to face T. J. Grant, but was forced from the bout with an injury and replaced by Charlie Brenneman. However, just days before the event Grant was forced from the card due to an unknown illness. Without proper time to find a replacement the bout was scrapped.

Anthony Johnson was expected to face Nate Marquardt in the main event, but was forced from the bout with a rotator cuff injury and replaced by Rick Story. However, Nate Marquardt did not receive medical clearance the day of the weigh-ins and therefore pulled out of the main event. Charlie Brenneman, whose earlier bout with T. J. Grant was removed from the card, stepped in to fight Rick Story, while the Pat Barry vs. Cheick Kongo fight was promoted to the main event. Dana White subsequently announced that Marquardt would be cut from the UFC due to the seriousness of the failed medical clearance but because of Pennsylvania health privacy laws, White could not disclose the specifics of the case 

Martin Kampmann was expected to face John Howard, but was forced from the bout with an injury and replaced by Matt Brown. Brown's original opponent Rich Attonito faced Daniel Roberts.

The entire preliminary card was streamed on Facebook.

The event drew an estimated 744,000 viewers on Versus.

Results

Bonus awards
Fighters were awarded $50,000 bonuses.

 Fight of the Night: Nik Lentz vs. Charles Oliveira
 Knockout of the Night: Cheick Kongo
 Submission of the Night: Joe Lauzon

References

UFC on Versus
2011 in mixed martial arts
Mixed martial arts in Pennsylvania
Sports competitions in Pittsburgh
2011 in sports in Pennsylvania
Events in Pittsburgh